The skor yike (Khmer: ស្គរយីកេ) is a family of Cambodian frame drums used in Yike theater. There are as many as 13 different sizes, including the largest, the skor mei (approximately 2 feet across, 25 centimeters/9 inches deep).  In the Yike drama, the skor mei starts and ends the music.

In a Yike play, there may be from 2 to 13 drums. The largest skor mei drum begins, all perform, and then the instruments fall away until only the skor mei is still playing.

See also
Music of Cambodia

References

External links
Photo of a large skor yike.
 Video, first few minutes of Lakon Yike (Yike Opera). Music and Yike drums start at 50 seconds.

Hand drums
Cambodian musical instruments